The Mini Countryman, also called Mini Crossover in Japan, is a subcompact luxury crossover SUV, the first vehicle of this type to be launched by BMW under the Mini marque. It was launched in 2010 and received a facelift in 2014. The second generation vehicle was released in 2017.

Pre-production concepts
The Mini Crossover Concept previewed the design of the Countryman. It has four doors (2 right swing open, 1 left swing open, 1 left lift/sliding) and four single seats. It was unveiled at the 2008 Paris Motor Show.

The 2010 Mini Beachcomber Concept was based on the Crossover Concept and the Mini Countryman, with no doors and no conventional roof. It included ALL4 all-wheel drive and offroad wheels. It was unveiled at the 2010 North American International Auto Show.

First generation (R60; 2010) 

The design of Mini's first five-door crossover echoed that of the Mini Crossover Concept. The production model was first unveiled at the 2010 Geneva Motor Show. UK models went on sale on 18 September 2010. The availability of models varies between markets, with the United States and Russia not taking the One versions or any diesel-powered models. The All4 all-wheel-drive option is available on variable models, again depending on the country.

The ALL4 all-wheel-drive powertrain includes electro-hydraulic differential, positioned directly on the transmission's final drive, to vary the power distribution from front to rear. Under normal driving conditions, up to 50 percent of the engine's power goes to the rear wheels. Under "extreme" conditions ("extreme" being undefined) up to 100 percent heads to the back wheels.

Early models included Cooper S, Cooper S ALL4, Cooper, One, Cooper D, Cooper D ALL4, and One D. Cooper SD, Cooper SD ALL4, Cooper D Automatic, Cooper D ALL4 Automatic were added from spring 2011.

In 2012 the Countryman received some minor amendments, including an EU6 exhaust emissions standard compliance for the One and Cooper models, and using a different clutch material and improved software to reduce stalling problems. They went on sale from November 2012.

A Cooper ALL4 model was added in July 2013.

Changes to US 2014 model year range included the omission of the interior "Centre Rail" feature from the back seats. The rail is still present in the front.

Countryman WRC (2010–)
This is the rallying version of Mini Cooper S ALL4 developed with Prodrive beginning in early 2009, with a 1.6-litre, four-cylinder turbo-charged engine from BMW Motorsport. The first test drive for the Mini Countryman WRC, which would also be available to customer teams, was planned for autumn 2010. It was unveiled at the Paris Show in 2010.

Countryman John Cooper Works (2012–2016)
Steering, suspension, wheels and appearance have also been modified. It was unveiled at the 2012 International Geneva Motor Show, and went on sale in autumn 2012.

Kiss Edition (2011)
In June 2011, Mini USA collaborated with rock band Kiss to create a quartet of one-off Countryman crossovers themed after the band. The cars were placed on auction on eBay, with proceeds going to UNICEF to help children affected by the Tōhoku earthquake and tsunami. The auction was able to raise US$129,000. Mini USA also sold replica vehicle wraps for Countryman owners through their website and dealerships.

Highlands Edition (2016) 
In a nod to the adventurous spirit of the United Kingdom’s northernmost region, the MINI Countryman Highlands Edition emphasized the Countryman’s versatility and rugged capabilities. The Edition set itself apart with a unique Crystal Silver roof and mirror caps - inspired by ice sheets and streams carving the Highland’s rugged mountain ranges and blue lochs, and was offered in four nature-oriented exterior colors: Cosmic Blue, Jungle Green, Midnight Grey, and Absolute Black. Limited to just 400 units, the MINI Highlands Edition began arriving stateside in September 2016. 

Variants: MINI (R60) Countryman Cooper S and Cooper S ALL4 models.

Safety
In November 2010, Euro NCAP awarded the Countryman a 5-star crash rating.

Reception
Pulitzer Prize winning automotive journalist Dan Neil suggested the Countryman had jumped the shark – that is to say the car pushed the Mini ethos beyond relevance, marking the zenith of popularity and the start of decline. Neil suggested that by making a vehicle that is longer, wider and taller, the company had forsaken the inner logic of the brand: excellent handling in a tiny size. In a March 2011 review titled What Part of 'Mini' Did You Not Grasp, BMW? , Neil wrote "with the Countryman, tiny sharks have been jumped."
The Countryman became Mini's second most popular model after the iconic Hardtop. The very first year of production it sold almost 50% more units than the Clubman, Convertible, and Coupe added together. Almost 1 out of every 3 vehicles Mini sold in the US in 2011 was a Countryman.
This trend continued through 2012 also with almost 1 in 3 MINIs sold again being a Countryman - both in the US and globally.
By the end of 2013 the Countryman was 31% of total U.S. sales for the Mini brand.

2014 update (R60 LCI) 
A minor facelift to the Countryman was unveiled at the 2014 New York International Auto Show. Changes include a new structure of the hexagonal radiator grill, underride guard elements for the Cooper S Countryman ALL4 and additional body colour options. It went on sale in July 2014. All variants carried over. US variants include Cooper, Cooper S, Cooper S ALL4, John Cooper Works (with ALL4), with 6-speed manual transmission or optional 6-speed automatic transmission.

Powertrain

Second generation (F60; 2017) 

The second generation Countryman was introduced at the LA Auto Show in November 2016 and went on sale in February 2017 in Europe, and March elsewhere. It was launched with three variants: Cooper (FWD or ALL4), Cooper S (FWD or ALL4), and in June 2017, the new Cooper S E ALL4 plug-in hybrid. The new Countryman is  longer than the first generation, and  wider. The Cooper Countryman will be powered by a turbocharged 3-cylinder engine, while the Cooper S will use a new 2.0-litre turbo I4.

The Cooper S E plug-in hybrid combines a 134 hp (100 kW) 3-cylinder petrol engine and a  synchronous electric motor, producing a combined system output of 221 hp (165 kW) with system torque of 385 N·m (284 lb-ft). Charging at a 240-volt socket takes 3 hours and 15 minutes.

Similar to the Countryman S, JCW Countryman can be mated to either a 6-speed manual or 8-speed automatic transmission (which comes with the option to choose between Normal, Sport, and Eco mode).

In summer 2019, Mini launched an updated version of the Countryman JCW, unofficially known as Countryman JCW 306.

The Countryman received a facelift in the latter half of 2020.

Powertrain

Safety
In May 2017, Euro NCAP awarded the Countryman a 5-star crash rating.

Motorsports

In July 2010, Mini announced plans to enter the World Rally Championship (WRC) with the Countryman beginning in 2011, and entering season-long tournament starting from 2012. The factory team had its first test outing of the 2011 WRC season at the 2011 Rally d'Italia Sardegna, before taking on the full calendar in 2012 and 2013. In the Intercontinental Rally Challenge, the RRC version had its first win at the 2012 Tour de Corse, driven by Dani Sordo. After just one season Mini terminated its works involvement in the World Rally Championship. The car continued to be used outside of the WRC, and won the 2012 Qatar International Rally and 2014 Barum Czech Rally Zlín, also taking podium finishes at the 2013 Rally of Lebanon.

The All4, equipped with a straight-six engine, has won the Dakar Rally 4 straight years beginning in 2012, with Stéphane Peterhansel driving in 2012 and cars from German Monster Energy X-raid Team won the 2013 Dakar Rally. Mini won the car category of the 2014 Dakar Rally with the All4 driven by Nani Roma. Another overall win in the 2015 Dakar Rally made it four straight wins, with a 100% finish rate. Carlos Saintz won again in 2020. The same team won the Abu Dhabi Desert Challenge five times from 2011, with other wins in the Baja Aragón, Desafio Ruta and Desafio Inca, and being the runner-up in the 2011 Silk Way Rally, 2012 Desafio Litoral Rally and 2015 Baja Russia Northern Forest. 

Khalifa Al Mutaiwei win the FIA Cross Country Rally World Cup in 2012, Krzysztof Holowczyc in 2013, Vladimir Vasilyev in 2014, and Nasser Al-Attiyah in 2015.

Jean-Philippe Dayraut used a Mini Countryman to win the Andros Trophy ice racing championship in 2013 and 2014.

A 900 bhp vehicle based on the Mini Countryman entered the 2013 Pikes Peak International Hillclimb, finishing third overall.

Team JRM entered the 2015 FIA World Rallycross Championship season, acquired ex-Prodrive Minis, which unlike its competitors, using 1.6-litre engine with some concessions so the cars were able to competing with 2.0-litre engine cars. Guy Wilks reaching the final in the British round. It was also entered into the 2013 Global RallyCross Championship, with Liam Doran winning the Munich round. A further car was entered into the 2015 FIA European Rallycross Championship season, driven by Riku Tahko.

The team eventually entering FIA World Rallycross full-time, with Liam Doran as the driver. The Minis losing its concessions, as they debuted their self developed 2.0-litre engine in the fourth round in Great Britain.

Production
The first generation Countryman was primarily built in Graz, Austria, under contract by Magna Steyr, making it the first of the BMW era Minis to be manufactured entirely outside the UK.

In 2013, assembly of the Countryman was expanded to three international locations: from April 2013 at BMW's plant near Chennai, India, specifically for the Indian market from June 2013 at the BMW Group Malaysia Assembly Plant in Kulim, Kedah, and at the BMW Manufacturing Thailand plant in Rayong from August 2013.

In 2012, worldwide sales of Countryman reached 102,000 units, 21,012 of which were sold in the US. In March 2013, the 250,000th Countryman was produced at Magna Steyr's Graz plant.

Since November 2016, the second generation Countryman has been assembled at VDL Nedcar in Born, the Netherlands.

See also
Mini All4 Racing

References

External links

 Mini Countryman (Mini USA)

Countryman
Cars introduced in 2010
2020s cars
Mini sport utility vehicles
Luxury crossover sport utility vehicles
Front-wheel-drive vehicles
All-wheel-drive vehicles
Euro NCAP small MPVs
Plug-in hybrid vehicles
Rallycross cars